Yang Mi (born 12 September 1986) is a Chinese actress and singer. She made her acting debut in the historical television series Tang Ming Huang, and later received recognition for her leading roles in various television series such as Wang Zhaojun (2007), Chinese Paladin 3 (2009), Palace 1(2011), Beijing Love Story (2012), Swords of Legends (2014), The Interpreter (2016), Eternal Love (2017) and Legend of Fuyao (2018); as well as films Mysterious Island (2011), Tiny Times (2013–2015), and The Witness (2015). In 2017, she won the Best Actress award at the WorldFest Houston International Festival for her performance in Reset (2017).

Yang was chosen by Southern Metropolis Daily as one of the New Four Dan Actresses.

Early life
Yang Mi was born in Xuanwu District, Beijing to a police officer and a housewife. She was given the name "" (exponentiation) because her parents both have the same surname Yang. She graduated from the now-defunct Beijing Xuanwu Experimental Primary School. Yang is also a graduate of Beijing Film Academy's Performance Institute.

Career

Beginnings
In 1990, at the age of four, Yang made her acting debut in the historical television series Tang Ming Huang directed by Chen Jialin, playing the role of young Princess Xianning. She also had a minor role as Beggar So's daughter in King of Beggars (1992), which starred Stephen Chow as the titular character. Two years later, she starred in the television series Hou Wa, where her acting left a deep impression on the producer.

In 2001, Yang resumed her career in entertainment business by working as an advertisement model. In 2002, Yang signed a contract with Li Shaohong's agency, Rosat Entertainment.
In 2003, Yang received her first script and made her official acting debut in The Story of a Noble Family.

2006–2010: Rising popularity
In the late 2000s, Yang started to gain increased attention and popularity with her roles as Nie Xiaoqian in legendary drama Strange Tales of Liaozhai (2005), and Guo Xiang in wuxia drama The Return of the Condor Heroes (2006), In 2007, Yang played the titular role of Wang Zhaojun in the eypnomous television series, which was broadcast on CCTV. She received positive reviews for her performance, and was nominated for the Best Actress award at the China TV Golden Eagle Award.

In 2009, Yang starred in the fantasy action drama Chinese Paladin 3, playing two different characters; Tang Xuejian and Xiyao. The series was a major hit in China and Yang experienced a rise in popularity.

In 2010, Yang starred in Li Shaohong's adaptation of the classic novel The Dream of Red Mansions, and received positive reviews for her portrayal of Qingwen. The same year, she starred in big-budget historical series Beauty's Rival in Palace, winning acclaim for her role as a cold assassin.

2011–2016: Breakthrough and Mainstream success
In 2011, Yang achieved widespread fame with her role as the time-traveling protagonist in the hit historical romance drama, Palace (2011). She was voted the Most Popular Actress at the 17th Shanghai Television Festival. The theme song of the drama sung by Yang, titled "In Support of the Love", was also a hit and won Best Theme Song (OST) at the 6th Huading Awards. The same year, she starred in horror film Mysterious Island, which raked in more than 70 million yuan at the box office and became the most successful horror film in China.

Mei Ah Entertainment announced that it will be producing four tailored-made films (Wu Dang, Chinese Princess Turandot, Windseeker, and Butterfly Cemetery) for Yang with a total investment of 300 million yuan for the four films due to the box office success of Mysterious Island. However, the films failed to live up to the success of Mysterious Island, and Yang was named Most Disappointing Actress at the Golden Broom Awards for her performance in Wu Dang.

In 2012, Yang starred in Beijing Love Story, a modern romance drama directed by Chen Sicheng; where she played a prideful gold digger. The series was a hit, and Yang won the Most Popular Actress award at the 9th China Golden Eagle TV Arts Festival. The same year she co-starred in Painted Skin: The Resurrection, a sequel to Gordon Chan's 2008 hit fantasy film Painted Skin.

Yang was then announced to play the leading protagonist Lin Xiao in the Tiny Times film series, based on Guo Jingming's best-selling novel of the same name. The first two installments of the film were released in 2013, with the subsequent installments released in 2014 and 2015. Despite receiving negative reviews, Tiny Times was an overwhelming success at the box office. Also in 2013, Yang took on the role of a television producer for the first time with web series V Love.

In 2014, Yang starred in the comedy film The Breakup Guru directed by Deng Chao. The film grossed 180 million yuan in its opening week and ended up as one of the highest-grossing films in China that year. She then starred in fantasy action drama Swords of Legends as the female lead Feng Qingxue.
The drama was a commercial success, topping television ratings and becoming the most watched Chinese drama online at that time.

In 2015, Yang starred in romance films You Are My Sunshine with Huang Xiaoming and Fall in Love Like a Star with Li Yifeng. She also challenged the role of a blind girl in The Witness, adapted from the South Korean thriller Blind.

In 2016, Yang starred in the modern drama The Interpreter, which premiered on Hunan TV. The series was a huge success, and became the highest-rated drama of 2016. She also featured in fantasy animated film L.O.R.D: Legend of Ravaging Dynasties, directed by Tiny Times director Guo Jingming.

2017–present: Critical acclaim
In 2017, Yang starred in Eternal Love, adapted from the xianxia novel Three Lives Three Worlds, Ten Miles of Peach Blossoms by TangQi GongZi. The fantasy-romance drama was a massive hit both locally and internationally and Yang received acclaim for her acting performance in the drama. She then starred in science fiction thriller Reset produced by Jackie Chan, which led to her win for Best Actress at the 50th WorldFest-Houston International Film Festival. Yang next starred in wuxia film Brotherhood of Blades II: The Infernal Battlefield alongside Chang Chen as a painter. She ranked third on Forbes China Celebrity 100 list for the year, her highest ranking yet.

In 2018, Yang starred in Negotiator, a modern workplace drama which deals with the profession of negotiators. Yang then headlined the fantasy adventure drama Legend of Fuyao. Yang returned to the big screen with Baby directed by Liu Jie, a film which tells the story of a woman who was abandoned by her parents due to severe birth defects, and her battle as an adult to try and save a baby in the same situation. She received positive reviews for her portrayal of a brittle, harried working-class woman prematurely aged by ill health and poverty. The same year, she was cast in the fantasy suspense film Assassin in Red directed by Lu Yang; where she would play the role of an antagonist.

In 2019, Yang starred in the period drama The Great Craftsman.
Yang was cast in the cyber-security drama Storm Eye as a police officer; and medical drama Thank You Doctor as a surgeon.

In 2020, Yang was cast in the historical fantasy drama Novoland: Pearl Eclipse.

Other activities
Since 2014, Yang Mi has established her own agency, Jay Walk Studio in collaboration with H&R Century Pictures.

Personal life
In early 2012, Yang Mi revealed her relationship with an Hong Kong actor-singer Hawick Lau through her Weibo. In November 2013, she announced their engagement. Yang Mi and Hawick Lau were married in Bali, Indonesia on 8 January 2014. 

On 1 June 2014, she gave birth to their daughter Noemie Lau at the Hong Kong Adventist Hospital, Hong Kong.

On 22 December 2018, Yang Mi and Hawick Lau announced their divorce in a joint-statement released by Chinese entertainment and media company Jiaxing Media.

Politics
On 25 March 2021, Yang Mi cut ties with Adidas, after several companies including the brand announced its decision to not use cotton sourced from the Xinjiang region due to concerns of Uyghur forced labour. This action was echoed by most other Chinese celebrities.

Social media
As of June 2021, Yang Mi has more than 110 million followers on Weibo, making her one of the most widely followed celebrities on the Chinese microblogging platform.

Filmography

Film

Television series

Short film

Variety show

Discography

Album

Singles

Music video

Awards and nominations

Forbes China Celebrity 100

References

External links

 
 Yang Mi on Internet Movie Database

1986 births
Chinese film actresses
Chinese Buddhists
Chinese television actresses
Living people
Chinese Mandopop singers
Singers from Beijing
20th-century Chinese actresses
21st-century Chinese actresses
Chinese television producers
Actresses from Beijing
Beijing Film Academy alumni
Jay Walk Studio
Chinese child actresses
21st-century Chinese women singers
Women television producers